Baba Kalan (also Romanized as Bābā Kalān and Bābā-ye Kalān; also known as Bābā Kalū, Bāba Keln, Bāba Kelu, Chashmeh-ye Bābā Kālān, Cheshmeh-ye Bābā Kalān, and Cheshmey-ye Bābā Kalān) is a village in Bibi Hakimeh Rural District, in the Central District of Gachsaran County, Kohgiluyeh and Boyer-Ahmad Province, Iran. At the 2006 census, its population was 1,431, in 320 families.

References 

Populated places in Gachsaran County